Roman River is a  biological Site of Special Scientific Interest (SSSI) south of Colchester in Essex. Two areas, Friday Wood and Donyland Wood, were formerly separate SSSIs.

The site is in two separate areas. The Roman River, after which the site is named, runs along the southern boundary of both of them. There are areas of woodland, grassland, fen, scrub and heath. The woodland it mainly ancient, and there are more than a thousand species of moths and butterflies, and nearly seventy of breeding birds, including hawfinches, tree pipits and yellow wagtails.

Footpaths and tracks runs through the site, including Cherry Tree Lane.

References 

Sites of Special Scientific Interest in Essex